Tentaspina is a genus of moths of the family Erebidae. The genus was erected by Michael Fibiger in 2011.

Species
Tentaspina venus Fibiger, 2011
Tentaspina duospina Fibiger, 2011
Tentaspina feriae Fibiger, 2011
Tentaspina balii Fibiger, 2011
Tentaspina sinister Fibiger, 2011
Tentaspina orienta Fibiger, 2011
Tentaspina paraorienta Fibiger, 2011

References

Micronoctuini
Noctuoidea genera